This is an incomplete list of films shot in City of Thousand Oaks in the U.S. state of California.

Several productions made use of the unusual appearance of the old Thousand Oaks Civic Center. It was the building that housed Proteus IV in the 1977 movie 'Demon Seed', and the bunker Steve Austin crossed a mine field to reach in a Season 2 episode of 'The Six Million Dollar Man' called 'The Return of the Robot Maker'.

https://www.imdb.com/title/tt0075931/?ref_=nv_sr_srsg_0

https://www.imdb.com/title/tt0702077/?ref_=ttep_ep15

Films

References

Films shot in California
Culture of Thousand Oaks, California
Lists of films shot in the United States